Bartholomew was an Irish priest in the early thirteenth century, the first recorded Archdeacon of Waterford.

References

13th-century Irish Roman Catholic priests
Archdeacons of Waterford